Aldo Ino Ilešič (born 1 September 1984 in Ptuj) is a Slovenian cyclist who last rode for UCI Continental team .

Major results

2003
 Tour of Slovenia
1st  Points classification
1st Stage 3
2004
 1st Stage 6 Olympia's Tour
2005
 1st Stage 1b (TTT) The Paths of King Nikola
 4th Poreč Trophy
2006
 1st Stage 5a Giro delle Regioni
 1st Stage 4 Course de la Solidarité Olympique
 5th Poreč Trophy
2007
 4th Poreč Trophy
2008
 1st Poreč Trophy
 1st Banja Luka–Belgrade I
 3rd GP Kranj
 4th Banja Luka–Belgrade II
2010
 Tour du Maroc
1st Stages 3, 7 & 10
 1st Stage 1 Vuelta Mexico Telmex
 Tour do Rio
1st Stages 4 & 5
2012
 1st Stage 7 Tour of Qinghai Lake
 1st Stage 4 Tour do Rio
 2nd Philadelphia International Championship
 6th Overall Tour of China I
1st Stage 3
2013
 1st Clarendon Cup
2015
 10th Trofej Umag
2016
 2nd Overall Red Hook Crit Series
2017
 9th Overall Red Hook Crit Series
1st Last-Chance-Race Barcelona No. 5
3rd Brooklyn No. 10
5th Milan No. 8

References

1984 births
Living people
Slovenian male cyclists
People from Ptuj